Alanna Ubach (born October 3, 1975) is an American actress, known for her roles as Serena McGuire in Legally Blonde (2001) & Legally Blonde 2 (2003), Isabel Villalobos in Meet the Fockers (2004), Maria in Sister Act 2: Back in the Habit (1993), Noreen in The Brady Bunch Movie (1995), Jane in Clockwatchers (1997), Naomi in Waiting... (2005) & Still Waiting... (2009), Margarete in Being Us (2011), Jeanine Pirro in Bombshell (2019), and the voice of Mamá Imelda in Coco (2017), as well as Jo Hernandez-Frumpkis on Girlfriends' Guide to Divorce, Suze Howard on Euphoria, Tessa Flores on Guilty Party, Carol Atkinson on The Flight Attendant, and Susan Bennett on Ted.

She has provided voices for several characters in a number of animated television shows and movies, such as Liz Allan on The Spectacular Spider-Man, the title character on El Tigre: The Adventures of Manny Rivera, Lola Boa on Brandy & Mr. Whiskers, Strudel on Pound Puppies, and four characters in the Oscar-winning animated film Rango (2011). She played the first female assistant, Josie, on the television show Beakman's World, for which she was nominated for a Young Artist Award in 1992.

Early life
Ubach was born on October 3, 1975, in Downey, California, the daughter of Sidna ( González) and Rodolfo Ubach. Her father was from San Juan, Puerto Rico, and her mother was from Sinaloa, Mexico.

In 1994, she received a positive review from The New York Times for her role as a Jewish girl in Kindertransport at the Manhattan Theatre Club. During this stage, she also landed a regular spot as Josie the assistant in the TV series, Beakman's World. Her early film roles included Airborne (1993), Sister Act 2: Back in the Habit (1993), Renaissance Man (1994), and The Brady Bunch Movie (1995). She later had roles in a series of indie films: Denise Calls Up (1995), in which she played the title character; Johns (1996), playing David Arquette's girlfriend, and in Freeway (1996) with Reese Witherspoon and Kiefer Sutherland, playing a Latina gang girl. She also played roles in more mainstream films like Clockwatchers (1997) and alongside Reese Witherspoon in the two Legally Blonde films.

Career
In 2004, Ubach starred in the movie Waiting..., alongside Ryan Reynolds and Anna Faris, and landed the role of a Latina caterer in Meet The Fockers (2004). She also had recurring roles on Hung (2009) and Californication (2013).

Ubach starred with Lisa Edelstein as a regular cast member on Bravo's first scripted series, Girlfriends' Guide to Divorce. Ubach portrayed Jo, who moved to Los Angeles to reinvent herself in the guest house of her newly divorced best friend from college, Abby. Ubach described the show as "fun and stylish, it's very relatable". The role of Jo was created following the exit of Janeane Garofalo.

Recent television roles include Suze Howard on Euphoria, Tessa Flores on Guilty Party, and Carol Atkinson on The Flight Attendant.

In 2022, it was announced that Ubach was cast in the lead role of Susan Bennett on the Peacock series Ted, the television adaptation of the hit movie.

Theater
In June 2008, Ubach starred in and narrated her ongoing one-woman show, Patriotic Bitch, which ran at the Clurman Theatre in Theater Row. Reviewing Patriotic Bitch, The New York Times described it as an "entertaining one-act series of character monologues" and noted that Ubach is "seriously talented".

Personal life
Ubach is married to record producer Thom Russo. They have a son.

Filmography

Film

Television

Video games

Accolades

References

External links

1975 births
Living people
Actresses from California
American actresses of Mexican descent
American actresses of Puerto Rican descent
American child actresses
American film actresses
American people of Mexican descent
American television actresses
American voice actresses
Hispanic and Latino American actresses
People from Downey, California
20th-century American actresses
21st-century American actresses